Margaret Helen Stevenson (February 8, 1912 – January 2, 2011) was an American film, stage and radio actress, known for her role as Margo Lane in the radio adaptation of The Shadow, opposite Orson Welles in 1938.

Early life 
She was born in Manhattan on February 8, 1912, the daughter of Irish-born actor Charles Alexander Stevenson, who was 60 years old when she was born, and his second wife Frances Riley, who was 22 years old at the time. She graduated from Brearley School in Manhattan. Stevenson was about to enroll at Bryn Mawr College in Pennsylvania, when the Great Depression began. She decided to pursue acting to earn an income instead of attending Bryn Mawr.

Career 
Stevenson made her Broadway debut in The Firebird in 1932. Her other Broadway credits included The Royal Family (1975), Hostile Witness (1966), One by One (1964), Big Fish, Little Fish (1961), Triple Play (1959), The Young and Beautiful (1955), The Leading Lady (1948), The Rugged Path (1945), Little Women (1944), Golden Wings (1941), You Can't Take It With You (1936), Stage Door (1936), Call It a Day (1936), Truly Valiant (1936), Symphony (1935), The Barretts of Wimpole Street (1935), A Party (1933), and Evensong (1933). She also acted in a West End production of The Seven Year Itch in London in the 1950s in addition to performing frequently in summer stock theatre and regional theater in the United States.

In addition to her work on The Shadow, Stevenson acted on Aunt Jenny's Real Life Stories on old-time radio. She also acted on television and for more than a decade did TV commercials.

Personal life 
Her second husband, Val Avery, whom she married in 1953, died on December 12, 2009, at age eighty-five.

By the late 1990s, Stevenson was blind as a result of macular degeneration.

Death 
She died at her home in Manhattan on January 2, 2011, at age 98. Her ashes were given to her daughter, actress Margot Avery.

Filmography

Film

Television

References

External links

 
 
 

1912 births
2011 deaths
American stage actresses
American radio actresses
People from Manhattan
20th-century American actresses
Actresses from New York City
Brearley School alumni
American film actresses
21st-century American women